Bronski Beat discography contains albums, singles and videos of the British pop music group Bronski Beat. They were a synthpop trio which achieved success in the mid-1980s.

Albums

Studio albums

Live albums

Remix albums

Compilation albums

Singles

As lead artist

As featured artist

Promotional singles

Other appearances

Videos

Video albums

Music videos

Notes

See also
List of number-one dance hits (United States)
The Communards discography
Jimmy Somerville discography

References

External links
AllMusic.com > Bronski Beat > Discography > Main albums/Compilations/Singles & EPs
 

Discographies of British artists
Pop music group discographies